Lieutenant General Devraj Anbu, PVSM, UYSM, AVSM, YSM, SM, ADC is a retired Indian Army general who served as Vice Chief of Army Staff (VCOAS). He assumed office on 1 June 2018 following the retirement of Lt Gen Sarath Chand, and retired on 31 August 2019.

He also served as General Officer-Commanding-in-Chief (GOC-in-C), Northern Command from 1 December 2016 to 31 May 2018. Before Commanding Northern Command, he had commanded IV Corps in the North East.

Early life and education 
Anbu is an alumnus of Sainik School, Amaravathinagar; National Defence Academy, Pune and Defence Services Staff College, Wellington. He also attended the  higher command course at Army War College, Mhow and a National Defence College equivalent university at Jakarta, Indonesia.

Career 
Anbu was commissioned into 14th Sikh Light Infantry on 7 June 1980. He has vast experience and has served in all types of operational environments ranging including Siachen Glacier; Counter-Insurgency Operations in Kashmir and Manipur; Operation Pawan in Sri Lanka. He has commanded a unit during Operation Parakram; a 53 Infantry brigade on the Line Of Control; 17 Mountain Division in Sikkim; Indian Military Training Team in Bhutan; IV Corps (Tezpur). He has held staff appointments which include General Staff Operation at the Division level in North-East India, General Staff Operation at Corps Level in Kashmir, and Military observer with UN peacekeeping mission in Namibia (UNTAG).

During 37 years of his career he has been awarded the Sena Medal for Operation Meghdoot, Yudh Seva Medal (2010) for command of 53 Infantry brigade, the Ati Vishisht Seva Medal for the command of 17 Mountain division, Uttam Yudh Seva Medal (2016) and the Param Vishisht Seva Medal (2017) for his service as General Officer Commanding-in-Chief, Northern Command. He is also the Colonel Of The Regiment of the Sikh Light Infantry .

Honours and decorations

Dates of rank

Personal life 
Lt Gen Anbu's father late Shri. Devaraj also rendered his services in Army. They hail from an agricultural family from Madurai, Usilampatti, Vagaikulam village. 
He is married to Mrs Gowri Anbu and they have a son who is serving in the Indian Army. He likes yoga, painting and gardening.

References 

Living people
Indian generals
Vice Chiefs of Army Staff (India)
Recipients of the Uttam Yudh Seva Medal
Recipients of the Ati Vishisht Seva Medal
Recipients of the Param Vishisht Seva Medal
Year of birth missing (living people)
National Defence Academy (India) alumni
Recipients of the Yudh Seva Medal
Recipients of the Sena Medal
Army War College, Mhow alumni
Defence Services Staff College alumni